Thalkirchdorf is part of the municipality of Oberstaufen in Oberallgäu in the German state of Bayern (Bavaria). From the AD 14th century on, the Konstanz valley was an important route for the transport of salt, an important good at the time.

Populated places in Bavaria
Oberallgäu